Altenberg an der Rax was a municipality (before 2015) in the district of Bruck-Mürzzuschlag in Styria, Austria, part of Neuberg an der Mürz.

References

Cities and towns in Bruck-Mürzzuschlag District